Akshay may refer to:

 Akshay Anand (born 1957), Bollywood and Television Actor
Akshay Anand Chand 
Akshay Chandra Sharma, Hindi writer, poet and a keen educationist from India
Akshay Chandra Sarkar (1846–1917), poet, an editor and a literary critic of Bengali literature
Akshay Darekar (born 1988), cricketer
Akshay Dewalkar, male Indian badminton player who competed at 2012 Japan Super Series
Akshay Dogra (born 1981), Indian actor and producer working in the television industry
Akshay Kapoor (born: Swapnil Gohil) (born 1980), Indian actor
Akshay Kumar Datta, born in Chupi in Bardhaman, Bengali writer
Akshay Kumar Boral (1860–1919), Bengali poet and writer
Akshay Khanna (born 1975), Indian film actor
Akshay H. Mehta (born 1945), former judge of the Gujarat High Court
Akshay Kumar (born 1967), Indian actor, producer and martial artist who has appeared in over a hundred Hindi films
Akshay Kumar Maitreya (1861–1930), Indian historian and social worker from Bengal
Akshay Kumar Sen, one of the lay disciples of Sri Ramakrishna, the 19th century Bengali mystic and saint
Akshay Mall (born 1992), Indian footballer
Akshay Oberoi (born 1985), Hindi film actor of Punjabi origin
Akshay Pratap Singh (born 1970), Indian politician from Pratapgarh in Uttar Pradesh
 Akshay Sethi (born 1980), Indian model and television actor
Akshay Venkatesh (born 1981), Indian Australian mathematician
Akshay Wakhare (born 1985), Indian cricketer
Akshay Yadav, member of the Samajwadi Party, winner in the Indian general elections, 2014

References

See also
INS Akshay (P35), Abhay class corvette, currently in service with the Indian Navy
Indian Akshay Urja Day, August 20 annually, awareness campaign about the developments of renewable energy in India
Akshay Tritiiya, a holy day for Hindus and Jains
Akshay Vat or Akshayavat or Akshay Vat ("the indestructible banyan tree"), a sacred fig tree mentioned in the Hindu mythology
Akhshay
Aksay (disambiguation)
Aksha (disambiguation)
Akshaya